Alessia Lucchini (born 20 November 1978) is an Italian former synchronized swimmer who competed in the 2000 Summer Olympics.

References

1978 births
Living people
Italian synchronized swimmers
Olympic synchronized swimmers of Italy
Synchronized swimmers at the 2000 Summer Olympics